NH 25 may refer to:

 National Highway 25 (India)
 New Hampshire Route 25, United States